The 2011 St Kilda Football Club season was the club's 114th since their introduction to the VFL/AFL in 1897.

Season Summary

2011 Preseason

Regular season

2011 Finals Series

Ladder

References

Listing of St Kilda game results in 2011

External links
 St Kilda Football Club official website

St Kilda Football Club seasons
St Kilda Football Club Season, 2011